The Arboretum de Royat (41 hectares) is an arboretum located in the forêt domaniale southwest of Royat, Puy-de-Dôme, Auvergne, France.

Royat is a spa town at the foot of the Parc des Volcans d'Auvergne and the Puy-de-Dôme, developed from 1850 onwards. The arboretum was established in 1931, and currently contains walking paths through over 40 types of trees, including conifers from North America and Europe such as Douglas fir, larch, and Lawson cypress. It is managed by the Office National des Forêts.

See also 
 List of botanical gardens in France

Links 
 
 Arboretum de Royat on clermontauvergnetourisme.com
 L’arboretum de Royat, un endroit insolite pour des escapades variées en toute liberté on La Montagne, 01/08/2014

Royat, Arboretum de
Royat, Arboretum de